Sequedin is a commune in the Nord department in northern France.

Heraldry

Twin towns
Sequedin is twinned with Maureilhan (Hérault, southern France) since 1989.

See also
Communes of the Nord department

References

External links
Official website

Communes of Nord (French department)
French Flanders